Slim Aarons (born George Allen Aarons; October 29, 1916 – May 30, 2006) was an American photographer noted for his images of socialites, jet-setters and celebrities.

Photography career
At 18 years old, Aarons enlisted in the United States Army, worked as a photographer at the United States Military Academy, and later served as a combat photographer in World War II and earned a Purple Heart. Aarons said combat had taught him the only beach worth landing on was "decorated with beautiful, seminude girls tanning in a tranquil sun."

After the war, Aarons moved to California and began photographing celebrities. In California, he shot his most praised photo, Kings of Hollywood, a 1957 New's Year's Eve photograph depicting Clark Gable, Van Heflin, Gary Cooper, and James Stewart relaxing at a bar in full formal wear. Aaron's work appeared in Life, Town & Country, and Holiday magazines.

Aarons never used a stylist, or a makeup artist. He made his career out of what he called "photographing attractive people doing attractive things in attractive places." An oft-cited example of this approach is his 1970 Poolside Gossip shot at the Kaufmann Desert House designed by Richard Neutra, with owner Nelda Linsk as one of the models in the photo. "I knew everyone," he said in an interview with The (London) Independent in 2002. "They would invite me to one of their parties because they knew I wouldn't hurt them. I was one of them." Alfred Hitchcock's film, Rear Window (1954), whose main character is a photographer played by Jimmy Stewart, is set in an apartment reputed to be based on Aarons' apartment.

In 1997, Mark Getty, the co-founder of Getty Images, visited Aarons in his home and bought Aarons' entire archive.

In 2017, filmmaker Fritz Mitchell released a documentary about Aarons, called Slim Aarons: The High Life. In the documentary it is revealed that Aarons was Jewish and grew up in conditions that were in complete contrast to what he told friends and family of his childhood. Aarons claimed that he was raised in New Hampshire, was an orphan, and had no living relations. After his death in 2006, his widow and daughter learned the truth that Aarons had grown up in a poor immigrant Yiddish-speaking family on the Lower East Side of Manhattan. As a boy his mother was diagnosed with mental health issues and admitted to a psychiatric hospital, which caused him to be passed around among relatives. He resented and had no relationship with his father and had a brother, Harry, who would later commit suicide. Several documentary interviewees postulate that if Aarons's true origins had been known, his career would have been unlikely to succeed within the restricted world of celebrity and WASP privilege his photography glamorized.

Death
Aarons died in 2006 in Montrose, New York, and was buried in Mount Auburn Cemetery in Cambridge, Massachusetts.

Bibliography

References

External links
Slim Aarons at the International Fine Arts Consortium
Slim Aarons at the Staley-Wise Gallery
Slim Aarons at Artnet
Slim Aarons at the New York Social Diary

1916 births
2006 deaths
United States Army personnel of World War II
Photographers from New York City
Burials at Mount Auburn Cemetery
Commercial photographers
People from Manhattan
American portrait photographers
United States Army soldiers
World War II photographers